Martín Bernat, (fl. 1450 -1505), a Spanish Gothic style painter, active in Zaragoza, where he had a long collaboration with Bartolomé Bermejo. His dates of birth and death are not known.

Early career
Son of another painter of the same name, it was documented that Bernat "promised to end within two years the altar of Santo Domingo de Silos left in Daroca unfinished by Bartolome Bermejo". The altarpiece, probably dismantled in the eighteenth century as a result of a fire suffered by the church, preserved in the Museo del Prado central table with the effigy of the owner, probably the only fully completed by Bermejo, and depicting the king Fernando I of Castile welcoming Santo Domingo de Silos. According to the documentation Bernat work was completed or retouched by Bermejo in incarnations. Between 1479 and 1484 he appears again documented together with Bartolomé Bermejo, busy restoring the polychrome altarpiece of the Cathedral and the painting of John de Lobera altarpiece for the chapel of the Visitation of the Pillar of Zaragoza, which now resides in a private collection.

Collaborations
This collaboration between Bernat and Bermejo left a deep imprint on Bernat and, generally speaking, in the Aragonese painting of the late fifteenth century, where enshrined saint typology created by Bermejo in Santo Domingo de Daroca is repeated often, especially in works attributed to Bernat or his circle, such as the St. Victorian between San Gaudioso and Saint Nazaire Cathedral or the San Blas Barbastro between San Vicente and San Lorenzo of the parish of St. Mary Magdalene of Lécera.

Along with Miguel Ximénez, Bernat was hired in 1485 to execute the high altar of the parish church of Blesa in the Province of Teruel, dedicated to the Legend of the Holy Cross, now in the Museum of Zaragoza. The fact that most of the payments were intended to Ximénez, who in 1487 charged and alone, suggests that participation was a minor Bernat contribution. He and his workshop in this altarpiece attributed the stronger character tables "primitive" and greater proximity to Bermejo, which are located in the attic, with the representation of a number of prophets, and the right side of the street, destined to the Passion of Christ, with scenes of Jesus before Caiaphas, Jesus with the Cross and Descent.

Work remains
Both painters, independent workshops but often associated in large works, again collaborated in 1489 to decorate the altar of All Saints to the Augustinians of Zaragoza, a lost work which is known from two painters traveled to Barcelona accompanied by a monk of the convent of Aragon, in order to study the high altar of St. Augustine by Jaume Huguet. A year later they came into contact with the Castilian painter Fernando del Rincón, signing a partnership agreement for possible future collaborations.

The surviving documents refer to a large number of contracts, and indicate that Bernat enjoyed an excellent reputation and could maintain a fruitful workshop, whose impact can be seen in numerous altarpieces of Aragonese scope. However the only works documented and preserved, with the exception of Blesa altarpiece, are already lost, both of 1493 and listed on the marriage of Maria de Soria painter. This is the altarpieces for the chapel of Talavera or Purification in the Tarazona Cathedral with interesting allegories of the Virtues and the Liberal Arts painted in grisaille, and the church of San Juan Bautista de Zaidín, which has preserved the central table Diocesan and Regional Museum of Lleida.

References
 Azcarate, José María (2000). Gothic Art in Spain. Madrid, Chair. .
 Beltran Lloris, Miguel and others (1990). Zaragoza Museum. Section of Fine Arts. Musea Nostra. European Collection of Museums and Monuments. .
 Gudiol, Joseph (1971). Medieval Painting in Aragon. Zaragoza, Institution Ferdinand. .
 About Berg, Judith, "The Miracle of snow and Martin Bernat Bartolomé Bermejo and Juan Lobera altarpiece for the cloister of the Pillar ', Goya (2006), No. 307-308.
 Lacarra Ducay, Maria del Carmen, "Meeting of Santo Domingo de Silos with Fernando I of Castile ', in Aragon in the Middle Ages, X-XI (1993), p. 450-454.
 Lacarra Ducay, Maria del Carmen, "a study Annotated table Bernat Martin County and Diocesan Museum of Lleida" Aragon in the Middle Ages, XX (2008), p. 413-425.
 Ortiz Valero, N., "The organ of the church of San Pablo de Zaragoza, work Johán Ximénez Garcés, conducted between 1480 and 1483", in: Bulletin of the Museum and Institute "Camon Aznar" No. XCII, Zaragoza, 2003, pp. 169–195.
 Valero Ortiz, N., "Martin Bernat" in: The Hispano-Gothic painting. Bartolomé Bermejo and his times ", National Museum of Catalan Art (February 26-May 11, 2003) and Museum of Fine Arts in Bilbao (June 9-August 31, 2003), pp.262-264.
 Valero Ortiz, N., "Last Will of Martin Bernat, painter of altarpieces, documented in Zaragoza between 1450 and 1505", in: Bulletin of the Museum and Institute "Camon Aznar", No. 106, Zaragoza, 2010, p. 181-199.

15th-century Spanish painters
Spanish male painters
16th-century Spanish painters
Painters from Aragon
Year of birth unknown
Year of death unknown